Grand-Gosier is a commune in the Belle-Anse Arrondissement, in the Sud-Est department of Haiti.
It has 10,852 inhabitants.

It is the birthplace of celebrated Haitian poet and Haitian Creole language advocate Félix Morisseau-Leroy.

References

Populated places in Sud-Est (department)
Communes of Haiti